The Saffron Walden by-election of 7 July 1977 was held after the death of Conservative Member of Parliament (MP) Sir Peter Kirk on 16 April that year. The Conservatives held on to the seat in the by-election.

Results

References

Saffron Walden by-election
Saffron Walden
Saffron Walden by-election
Saffron Walden by-election
By-elections to the Parliament of the United Kingdom in Essex constituencies
1970s in Essex